The , officially the , is a Japanese funicular line in Isehara, Kanagawa. This is the only line  operates. The company belongs to Odakyū Group. The line opened in 1931, as a route to Ōyama Afuri Shrine on Mount Ōyama. The line is now also used for hiking.

Basic data
Distance: 
Gauge: 
Stations: 3
Vertical interval:

Stations
The line has three stations. From the foot of the hill:
 Ōyama Cable Station (大山ケーブル駅)
 Ōyamadera Station (大山寺駅)
 Afurijinja Station (阿夫利神社駅)

All the stations were renamed on October 1, 2008. Their former names were Oiwake Station (追分駅), Fudōmae Station (不動前駅) and Shimosha Station (下社駅) respectively.

See also
List of funicular railways
List of railway companies in Japan
List of railway lines in Japan

References

External links
 Official website 
Official website (in English)

Funicular railways in Japan
Rail transport in Kanagawa Prefecture
1067 mm gauge railways in Japan
1931 establishments in Japan